Ashok Chandna (born 13 January 1984) is an Indian politician and elected member of 15th Rajasthan Legislative Assembly representing Hindoli constituency as a member of Indian National Congress party. He also holds the position of Minister of State for Youth Affairs & Sports Department (Independent Charge), Skill, Employment & Entrepreneurship (Independent Charge),
Transport, and 
Soldier Welfare in the Government of Rajasthan.

Education and early life 
Ashok Chandna was born on 13 January 1984 in a farmers family at Shopuriya Ki Bawri, Nainwa, Bundi. He completed his schooling from Birla Senior Secondary School, Pilani and Graduate from University of Pune.

Political journey 
Ashok Chandna joined Indian National Congress party in the year of 2009 as a general congress worker. In the same year he was elected as a member to Ajmer Zila Parishad and the General Secretary to the Rajasthan Youth Congress. Later, in 2013 he went on to become the president of Rajasthan Youth Congress and was elected as the member of Rajasthan Legislative Assembly from Hindoli constituency in October 2013. On 11 December 2018 he was re-elected and was also included as Minister of State into the Third Gehlot ministry.

Sports 
He represented Rajasthan in the year 2001 in 200-meter back stroke. He also has represented Bhilwara Cricket Team from 2008 to 2010. Currently, he is heading Chandna Group Polo team which has won Sawai Man Singh Vase and Thunderbolt Cup in the year 2013.

Ashok Chandna conceptualised the Rajasthan Gramin Olympics. The rural games were scheduled from 29 August 29 to 5 October 2022. Where more than 30 lakhs people registered and Rajiv Gandhi Rural Olympic Games termed as pivotal moment that will help in creating a sports culture in Rajasthan followed by other states.

Controversies 
He landed in controversy when an audio clip of phone conversation of him went viral on social media in which he was allegedly heard using a casteist slur against Congress worker Raju Gurjar over the ticket for the panchayat polls.

References

Rajasthan MLAs 2008–2013
People from Bundi district
Rajasthani politicians
Living people
1984 births
Indian National Congress politicians
Rajasthan MLAs 2013–2018
Rajasthan MLAs 2018–2023